John Lyon (1514–1592) was a significant English landowner, who by 1564 had the largest land-rental income in Harrow, and who was subsequently the founder of Harrow School, and of The John Lyon School, and of the John Lyon's Charity. The Harrow School house, Lyon's, is named after him. He was a member of the Anglo-Norman Lyons family, and was a first cousin of Sir John Lyon, who was Lord Mayor of London for 1554 to 1555.

Life
John Lyon, who was born in 1514, and resided at Preston Hall,  was a member of the Anglo-Norman Lyons family that owned estates at Harrow-on-the-Hill. He was the son of John Lyon (b. c.1450), and the first cousin of Sir John Lyon, who was Lord Mayor of London in 1553–1554, who was a member of the Worshipful Company of Grocers. John descended from another John Lyon, who in 1370 received land at Kingsbury (of the parish of Edgware). Some sources identify his mother as a woman named Joan who married his father: others identify his mother as Emma Hedde (b. c.1470).

Lyon died on 3 October 1592 without issue: and his wife, Joan, died on 30 August 1608. Both he and his wife were buried in St Mary's, Harrow on the Hill, where they have memorials. A monumental brass bearing the effigies of John and his wife, that had an inscription, was removed from the floor during a restoration, and placed against a wall of the church. However, in 1888, a marble slab with a Latin inscription was laid over his grave.

Charities
John Lyon by 1564 had the largest land-rental income in Harrow, and was in 1572 the founder, with Royal Charter, of Harrow School, and of The John Lyon School, and of the John Lyon's Charity. A Harrow School house, Lyon's, is named after him, but the Harrow School buildings that were built after his death were built by and named after another John Lyon.

Lyon established a trust for the maintenance of Harrow Road and Edgware Road, for which the income from his estate is dispensed by John Lyon's Charity, which grants for charities and for state schools of young people in nine London boroughs: Barnet, Brent, Camden, Ealing, Hammersmith & Fulham, Kensington & Chelsea, Harrow, and the Cities of London and Westminster. Lyon's family had a lion in its coat of arms that is represented as a supporter in the contemporary coat of arms of the London Borough of Brent, and as a crest in the contemporary coat of arms of the London Borough of Harrow.

Lyon spent twenty English marks every year on the education of poor children, as a consequence of which, on 13 February 1572, Queen Elizabeth granted him a Royal Charter by Letters Patent to found a free grammar school for the education of boys at Harrow, and to incorporate his trustees as Governors of the "Free Grammar-School of John Lyon". He also invested in property at Marylebone in 1571, with his wife and the Governors of this school, the rents from which were used to the repair the high-road between Edgware and London, and the surplus from which were used to repair the road between Harrow and London. Subsequently, after the Clerk to the Signet proposed to levy £50 from Lyon as a loan to the state, the attorney-general Sir Gilbert Gerard contended that Lyon ought to not be forced to sell lands that he had bought for the maintenance of his school.

Lyon during 1590 stipulated statutes for his school that provided for a schoolmaster with the degree of M.A., and an usher with the degree of B.A., both to be unmarried, and that provided the admission fees and activities for scholars (including top-driving, handball, running, and shooting) who were to learn the Protestant catechism and attend mass, and to be taught Greek in the two highest forms.

See also
Lyons family

References

External links

GENUKI: Middlesex: Harrow-on-the-Hill
Harrow Church from British History Online.

1510s births
1592 deaths
Founders of English schools and colleges
Harrow School
16th-century English people
School founders